Glan Llyn is the name of a mixed-use community development, to the south-east of Newport, South Wales, at the western end of the former Llanwern steelworks, on the A4810 road at the edge of the Caldicot Levels.

Background
The steel production section of Llanwern steel works closed in 2001, leading to the loss of 1,300 jobs. A finishing plant still remains in operation today. After the closure of steel production, Corus Group sought a redevelopment partner; they chose St. Modwen Properties, who in 2004 bought a  package of land. The redevelopment process started with the clearing of the former steel works buildings, and making the site environmentally safe. This allowed the use of the site for a Park & Ride facility for the 2010 Ryder Cup event at the Celtic Manor Resort. Eventually up to 400,000 tonnes of concrete from the former steel works will be used in the redevelopment of the site.

Redevelopment
St Modwen set out a £1 bn mixed-use redevelopment plan for the site, which it was envisaged would take 20 years to complete, in around 2026–28. The new community plan included the construction of 4,000 homes, with a supporting infrastructure that includes schools, a police station, pub/restaurant, supermarket, community centre as well as a number of open spaces including two new lakes and a water theme park, new access roads, a GPs' surgery plus health and leisure facilities. (The name Glan LLyn means "lake shore".)

The first phase was approved in April 2010 by Newport City Council; this is to create 1,330 homes, the district centre, a primary school and the west lake. After gaining specific planning permission in April 2011, Persimmon plc started work on the construction of the first 307 homes in September 2011. The Persimmon/Charles Church developments were completed in 2016. St Modwen is currently building houses around the Pools and Lakeside Parks areas of the development, and Bellway Homes commenced work on building further houses adjacent to the St Modwen site at Monk's Meadow in autumn 2016. There are plans for a railway station at the northern end of the development.

Due to its proximity to the M4 and the Second Severn Crossing, and relatively low property prices (compared to South West England) it has proved to be very popular with commuters working in Bristol. Its popularity has risen in recent years following the abolition of the tolls on both motorway bridges at the end of 2018.

"In the Nick of Time"
Glan Llyn is home to the mechanical clock known as "In the Nick of Time" created by sculptor Andy Plant. The clock was commissioned and paid for by Newport Council at a cost of £100,000, as part of Ebbw Vale Garden Festival. On the hour, the structure would open to reveal the hidden characters inside. After the festival event the clock was relocated to John Frost Square, Newport, where it remained until the redevelopment of the area into Friars Walk. After almost seven years in storage it was finally relocated to the westernmost roundabout on Queen's Way. The clock is a popular landmark in the area.

Parks and Recreation
The development currently has two main parks: Pools Park (including the Western Pools) and Lakeside Park (formerly known as Western Park), both of which include man-made lakes, and are home to an extensive range of wildfowl. Pools Park was originally home to the Spencer Steel Works Angling Club, and is located just inside the former main entrance to the steel works. The parks are popular with residents, as well as visitors to the nearby Newport Retail Park.

Central Park, a smaller park for younger children, is located in the centre of the development at Brinell Square.

The development is close to a number of popular tourist attractions, including the RSPB reserve at the Newport Wetlands and the world-famous Newport Transporter Bridge.

Politics and Representation
Glan Llyn is part of the Llanwern electoral ward, which itself is part of the Newport East UK parliamentary constituency.

Schools 
Glan Llyn is situated within the catchment area for Lliswerry High School. Glan Llyn West primary school is situated at the western end of the site.

See also
Llanwern
Llanwern A.F.C.

References

External links
Glan Llyn development website
Celtic Business Park
www.geograph.co.uk : photos of Llanwern and surrounding area
BBC Wales video report on master plan approval, April 2010

Districts of Newport, Wales